Animal studies is the interdisciplinary study of animals including anthropology, biology, history, psychology, and philosophy.

Animal studies or animal research may refer to:
Animal testing or animal experimentation, the use of non-human animals in experiments
Ethology, the study of animal behavior
Anthrozoology, the study of human-animal interaction
Animality studies,  an academic field focused on the cultural study of animals
Animal science, the study of animals under human use
Zoology, the scientific study of animals, encompassing many of the above disciplines